Brawl in the Family was a gag-a-day webcomic written and drawn by Matthew Taranto. The webcomic was inspired by the Super Smash Bros. series and features characters from various video game franchises, such as Kirby, Super Mario, Pokémon, F-Zero, Metroid, Metal Gear, and many others. The webcomic concluded on October 3, 2014, having produced a total of 600 comics.

Setting and cast
Brawl in the Family is a play on words - a portmanteau of All in the Family and the Nintendo game Super Smash Bros. Brawl. The comic featured a variety of playable characters from the Super Smash Bros. series, with Kirby as its protagonist. Other characters playing a large role include King Dedede, Meta Knight, Captain Falcon and Jigglypuff, along with fellow Kirby characters Adeleine and Waddle Dee. Brawl in the Family primarily consisted of short visual jokes and wordplay, but also featured longer storylines and music videos, often to mark special occasions. Later in the series, the webcomic began to feature characters that were announced to be playable in Super Smash Bros. for Nintendo 3DS and Wii U.

The webcomic later introduced a few original characters, such as Eario, the unseen janitor of Mushroom Kingdom, tasked with cleaning up in Mario's wake. Brawl in the Family expanded upon existing Nintendo characters by creating romances between Kirby and Jigglypuff, as well as Samus Aran and Captain Falcon, and by turning originally minor characters into recurring characters, such as Waluigi and a Bug Catcher from the Pokémon series. Gaming website Retro described Brawl in the Family as "almost aggressively lighthearted," because where "a lot of comedic webcomics tend to veer into cynical territory," Retro described Brawl in the Family as having a "warm, family friendly tone."

Notable comics

Brawl in the Family started under the title of Kirby Comics and was only uploaded on websites such as GameFAQs and IGN forums, until Taranto decided to expand the webcomic's cast and publish it on his own website, which was designed by Chris Seward. The first strip on the website is "The Showdown", published on June 13, 2008, showing a visual gag of Kirby transforming into his nemesis/best friend King Dedede. The character Waluigi was introduced in the April Fool's Day 2009 strip as a joke character, becoming a recurring and popular character with readers.
 
Musical comics were introduced with the 115th comic, How the King Stole Christmas Part 2, featuring the song "You're a Mean King", which parodied "You're a Mean One, Mr. Grinch". The 400th Brawl in the Family strip is a music video titled "The History of Nintendo", which covers the US releases of many Nintendo games throughout the company's history. Nintendo Life stated that the video "crams some good detail into its 3:42 running time" and described it as "catchy." Taranto himself called it his personal favorite Brawl in the Family video. "The History of Nintendo" was released shortly after Taranto underwent major surgery and was temporarily unable to work on more strips.

In response to Mega Man being revealed as a playable character in Super Smash Bros. for Nintendo 3DS and Wii U and as the webcomic's 500th strip, Taranto uploaded a short video titled "Prodigal Robot" as a tribute to the iconic game character, while poking fun at the "popularity curve" of the Mega Man franchise.

Nintendo Force
Taranto was contacted by Lucas Thomas of IGN to be one of the comic artists of Nintendo Force Magazine. After stopping with Brawl in the Family, Taranto continued working on Nintendo-themed comics for the magazine.

Ending
Taranto announced his webcomic's end on July 25, 2014, in his 580th strip titled "World Eight-Four". Taranto later confirmed his final strip to be released on 3 October, precisely on the date Super Smash Bros. for Nintendo 3DS was going to be released. Though this was purely coincidental, Taranto described it as "very fitting", as the webcomic started around the time Super Smash Bros. Brawl was released. In an interview with WiiU Daily, Taranto detailed his reasons to stop with his webcomic: "[I] feel like I’ve pushed it about as far as it can go by this point. It’s gotten more difficult to come up with unique concepts for strips that I haven’t already covered at some point, and I’m ready to dive into projects that involve non-existing IPs."

The final comic, "One Final Song", was described as "a very nostalgic musical number, drawing together tracks from [the webcomic's] long and musical history" and was dedicated to "all of the individuals that have enjoyed his work over the years." Armed Gamer stated that the song "really hits in the feels" and praised the five "Meet Me at Final Destination" comics that led up to it.

Kickstarter campaigns
Taranto's first Kickstarter campaign was to fund Brawl in the Family: Volume 1, a comic book treasury containing the webcomic's first 200 strips, as well as bonus content. The campaign reached its initial goal of $10,000 within the first 24 hours and raised more than $56,000 in total.

Around the time of the webcomic's end, Taranto started a Kickstarter campaign to fund the release of two more hardcover and paperback comic book treasuries containing the remaining 400 comics, as well as a large amount of bonuses. Each book contains a total of 200 strips, covering 244 pages. Available Kickstarter rewards included, but were not limited to, paperback and hardcover versions of all 3 books, a slipcase and signatures. Though the campaign hit its goal, the two new books were almost exclusively given to Kickstarter backers.

Taranto also composed the soundtrack and contributed to the Kickstarter campaign for Nefarious. Josh Hano, the creator of Nefarious, drew a crossover comic for Brawl in the Family which featured the game's protagonist, Crow. Hano also worked on the art and animations of Tadpole Treble.

Tadpole Treble

In November 2013, together with his brother Michael, Matthew Taranto started a Kickstarter campaign for Tadpole Treble, a music video game featuring a tadpole named Baton. In this game, the music determines the layout of the level. There was a demo of Tadpole Treble available during the Kickstarter campaign. The game was successfully funded on December 7, 2013, and was released for Steam on May 6, 2016 and for Wii U on August 11 of the same year. An enhanced version of the game titled Tadpole Treble Encore was announced for Nintendo Switch, and was released on January 21, 2021.

Too Bad. Waluigi Time 
On March 31, 2018, Taranto launched a Kickstarter for Too Bad. Waluigi Time, a comic book treasury featuring all of Waluigi's previous appearances in the webcomic, along with 200 new strips focusing on the character and 30 additional Brawl in the Family comics, called Back in the Family. The book reached its $25,000 goal in three days, ultimately raising over $90,000 by the time of the campaign's conclusion. The book was released physically and digitally on April 1, 2020.

Gamemaster Classified
On February 9, 2021, Taranto launched another brand new Kickstarter for a hardcover book co-written by Howard Phillips, which is about lawsuits, reviews, comics and more relating to Nintendo and Phillips. It achieved its $23,000 goal within the first seven hours of being posted to Kickstarter.

Podcast
Taranto and website designer Chris Seward launched the Brawl in the Family Podcast in February 2013. The podcast is mainly based around the discussion of video games, and has continued even following the end of the comic.

References

External links

Brawl in the Family
Matthew Taranto's company website

2000s webcomics
2010s webcomics
2008 webcomic debuts
2014 webcomic endings
American comedy webcomics
Parody webcomics
Short form webcomics
Video game webcomics
Webcomics in print
Gag-a-day comics
Kickstarter-funded publications
Comics based on Nintendo video games